Hans-Michael Rehberg (2 April 1938 – 7 November 2017) was a German actor.

Biography
Rehberg, born in Fürstenwalde, Brandenburg, was one of six children. He grew up in Bavaria after the family moved to Lake Starnberg.
After training as an actor at the Folkwang School in Essen from 1956 to 1958, his professional career began at the Theater Krefeld und Mönchengladbach. He soon came to the Residenztheater in Munich, where he was appointed Bavarian State Actor at the age of 30. In 1973 he moved to the Münchner Kammerspiele, in 1975 to the Schauspielhaus Hamburg. The versatile actor was present in theater, television and cinema. Rehberg was also active as a director and has received several awards for his work. He was at home on almost every major German-speaking theatre stage. Rehberg died in Berlin at the age of 79.

Awards
 1968: Appointment to Bayerischer Staatsschauspieler
 1994: Austrian theatre award 
 1999: Gertrud-Eysoldt-Ring
 2000: Bayerischer Fernsehpreis
 2015: Award of the Deutsche Akademie für Fernsehen, Actor leading role

Filmography

References

External links 

1938 births
2017 deaths
People from Fürstenwalde
People from the Province of Brandenburg
German male film actors
German male television actors
20th-century German male actors
21st-century German male actors